The following volleyball players took part in the women's tournament at the 1964 Summer Olympics.

Rosters

Masae Kasai (c)
 Emiko Miyamoto
 Kinuko Tanida
 Yuriko Handa
 Yoshiko Matsumura
 Sata Isobe
 Katsumi Matsumura
 Yoko Shinozaki
 Setsuko Sasaki
 Yuko Fujimoto
 Masako Kondo
 Ayano Shibuki
Head coach
Hirofumi Daimatsu

Krystyna Czajkowska
 Maria Golimowska
 Krystyna Jakubowska
 Danuta Kordaczuk
 Krystyna Krupa
 Józefa Ledwig
 Jadwiga Marko
 Jadwiga Rutkowska
 Maria Śliwka
 Zofia Szczęśniewska
 Hanna Busz
 Barbara Hermel
Head coach
 Stanisław Poburka

Ana Mocanu
Cornelia Lăzeanu
Natalia Todorovschi
Doina Ivănescu
Doina Popescu
Sonia Colceru
Lia Vanea
Alexandrina Chezan
Ileana Enculescu
Elisabeta Goloşie
Marina Stanca
Head coach

Seo Chun-gang
 Mun Gyeong-suk
 Yu Chun-ja
 Kim Gil-ja
 O Sun-ok
 Jeong Jeong-eun
 Choi Don-hui
 Hong Nam-seon
 O Cheong-ja
 Yun Jeong-suk
 Gwag Yong-ja
 Lee Geun-su
Head coach

Nelli Abramova
 Astra Biltauere
 Lyudmila Buldakova
 Lyudmila Gureyeva
 Valentina Kamenek
 Marita Katusheva
 Ninel Lukanina
 Valentina Mishak
 Tatyana Roshchina
 Inna Ryskal
 Antonina Ryzhova
 Tamara Tikhonina
Head coach

Jean Gaertner
 Lou Galloway
 Barbara Harwerth
 Patti Bright
 Linda Murphy
 Gail O'Rourke
 Nancy Owen
 Mary Jo Peppler
 Mary Margaret Perry
 Sharon Peterson
 Verneda Thomas
 Jane Ward
Head coach
 Doc Burroughs

References

1964